Abington House (located at, and originally known as, 500 West 30th Street) is a residential building in Chelsea, in Manhattan, New York City just outside the Hudson Yards Redevelopment Project. There are 386 rental apartments at the building, located at the southwest corner of 30th Street and Tenth Avenue. Robert A.M. Stern Architects designed the building, and The Related Companies developed the building. The building, the first to open in the area under the zoning of the Hudson Yards Redevelopment Project, has 78 permanent units. It started leasing in April 2014, two years after beginning construction in 2012.

References

Further reading
Arak, Joey. "Brookfield Properties Goes Splittsville" on Curbed.com (November 19, 2007)
Chaban, Matt. "Scaling the Towers of Hudson Yards" in The New York Observer (July 12, 2011)
Davidson, Justin. "From 0 to 12 Million Square Feet" New York (October 7, 2012).
 Samtani, Hiten. "Anatomy of a deal: Inside Related/Oxford’s unusual financing of Hudson Yards" in The Real Deal (August 16, 2013)
Sheftell, Jason. "New York City officials, developers to break ground on $15 billion mini-city Hudson Yards" New York Daily News (December 4, 2012)

External links 
 Hudson Yards
 New York City project website
 Related Companies project website
 Hudson Yards news and developments

Hudson Yards, Manhattan
Chelsea, Manhattan
Residential skyscrapers in Manhattan
Robert A. M. Stern buildings
Residential buildings completed in 2014
Buildings developed by the Related Companies
New Classical architecture